Fernando Atria Lemaitre (born 1968) is a Chilean intellectual, lawyer, university teacher and politician. Atria has been an avid participant of the intellectual debates about reforms in the Chilean education system and the Constitution of Chile. 

He has been called by El Mostrador "the ideologue of the 2011 Chilean student protests". Writing in El Desconcierto in 2018 pundit Rodrigo Karmy Bolton posits that Fernando Atria is Axel Kaiser's main "intellectual enemy". Similarly, there have been centre-right intellectuals like Hugo Eduardo Herrera who have been strong critics of Atria.

In the 2021 Chilean Constitutional Convention election Atria won a seat into the Constitutional Convention that drafted a new constitution proposal for Chile. During this time Atria made frequent TV appearances defending the work of the convention and the proposed constitution.

References

1968 births
University of Chile alumni
Academic staff of the University of Chile
20th-century Chilean lawyers
21st-century Chilean lawyers
21st-century Chilean male writers
Chilean essayists
21st-century essayists
Members of the Chilean Constitutional Convention
Living people
Chilean scholars of constitutional law
People from Santiago